= Jean Beard =

American academic

Jean Beard is an American educator currently Professor Emerita, focused in evolution education and education about the nature of science, at Indiana University and an Elected Fellow of the American Association for the Advancement of Science.
